Iceblink is a white light seen near the horizon, especially on the underside of low clouds, resulting from reflection of light off an ice field immediately beyond.  The iceblink was used by both the Inuit and explorers looking for the Northwest Passage to help them navigate safely.

See also 
 Water sky

References

Atmospheric optical phenomena